James H. Donovan is an American investment banker who is Vice Chairman of Global Client Coverage at Goldman Sachs. Donovan is also an adjunct professor at the University of Virginia School of Law whose YouTube videos have racked up over two and a half million views.

On March 15, 2017, President Donald Trump nominated Donovan to serve as Deputy Secretary of the Treasury. He was nominated despite concerns within the Trump administration that with the addition of Donovan, there will be "too many Goldman guys" in top posts. Donovan withdrew from consideration on May 19, 2017.

Donovan served as a member of the President's Intelligence Advisory Board (PIAB), which oversees and advises the President on all 17 US Intelligence Agencies.

Education
Donovan earned his Bachelor of Science degree in chemical engineering from the Massachusetts Institute of Technology, where he was a varsity rower, and a Master of Business Administration degree from MIT Sloan School in 1989. He earned his Juris Doctor degree from Harvard Law School in 1993.

Personal life
In 2020, he was reported to be dating Trump advisor and Fox executive Hope Hicks.

References

Further reading

External links
 Jim Donovan biography - adjunct professor, University of Virginia School of Law

American bankers
Goldman Sachs people
Harvard Law School alumni
Living people
MIT School of Engineering alumni
MIT Sloan School of Management alumni
Year of birth missing (living people)